Victory Christian Fellowship of the Philippines, Inc. is an evangelical multi-site church based in Taguig City, the Philippines. It is a member of Every Nation Churches.

History	
Victory was started by missionaries Steve and Deborah Murrell, who came to the Philippines in 1984 together with Ever Nation Churches co-founder Rice Broocks and 65 other American university students on a one-month summer mission trip. Since 1984, Victory has grown until it presently has churches in 60 Philippine cities. 

In 2015, Victory's Metro Manila church had 15 congregations, all with multiple services and locations, and many offering more than one language (English). The church has multiple locations and holds 94 services every weekend, each of them led by live preaching, training Filipinos to reach their cities, the nation, and the world. Over 10,000 leaders conduct small weekly discipleship groups.  Victory reported 65,000 members in Manila in 2020.

Discipleship and leadership training
Since its inception in 1984, the church encourages members to compassionately engage communities, intentionally establish biblical foundations, strategically equip believers, and continually empower disciples. Its primary vehicle for discipleship is the Victory group, a small group of people who get together, build relationships, and study the Bible.

Victory Worship
In 2014, Victory Worship released its first live worship album, Radical Love. Radical Love and its 2015 follow-up, Rise Heart, were certified Gold by the Philippine Association of the Record Industry, Inc. (PARI). On March 25, 2017, the group released Awit ng Bayan, its first full Filipino-language single; on June 1, 2017, Safe, its latest digital single, was released to radio and on digital formats. An extended play, For Your Purpose, was released on December 1, 2017. On March 16, 2018, it released its latest extended play, In Your Name.

Beliefs
As a member church of Every Nation Churches, Victory adheres to the statement of faith of the Philippine Council of Evangelical Churches.

See also
List of the largest evangelical churches
List of the largest evangelical church auditoriums
Worship service (evangelicalism)

References

External links
 
 Victory Worship
 Every Nation Movement

Christian organizations established in 1984
1984 establishments in the Philippines
Evangelical megachurches in the Philippines
Churches in Metro Manila